Kenneth Miller may refer to:

Politics
Ken A. Miller (born 1966), Oklahoma State Treasurer
Ken Miller (Montana politician), member of the Montana State Senate

Sports
Ken Miller (gridiron football) (born 1941), head coach of the Saskatchewan Roughriders
Ken Miller (American football) (born 1958), American football cornerback
Kenny Miller (basketball) (born 1967), former basketball player
Kenny Miller (born 1979), Scottish footballer
Kenneth Miller (cricketer) (born 1958), Trinidadian cricketer

Other
Ken Miller (curator) (born 1963), curator, writer-editor
Ken Miller (television producer) (born 1952), senior vice president of Spelling Television
Kenneth G. Miller (born 1956), American geologist
Kenneth P. Miller (born 1948), American political scientist
Kenneth R. Miller (born 1948), American biologist known for his role in Kitzmiller v. Dover Area School District 
Kenneth Hayes Miller (1876–1952), American painter and teacher

See also
Kenneth Millar, American-Canadian writer